Jumping the Tracks is the fifth studio album release from +/-. It contains 12 tracks.

Critical reception

At Alternative Press, Annie Zaleski rated the album four stars out of five stars, stating the "Pensive and engaging, Jumping The Tracks is the quintessential headphones record that gets better with each listen." In addition, Zaleski noting that the album features "A smattering of atmosphere flourishes (backmasked sounds, twinkling percussion, howling harmonies) add welcome melancholy and texture." At AllMusic, Fred Thomas also rated the album four out of five stars and stated that the album "communicates greater depth and more sophistication than any of their other work."

Track listing
 "Young Once"
 "The Bitterest Pill"
 "Toe the Line"
 "The Space Between Us"
 "What Lies Ahead"
 "Exorcising Your Ghost"
 "Rewrite the Story"
 "There Goes My Love"
 "Running the Distance"
 "No One Can Touch You Now"
 "Jumping the Tracks (Bonus)"
 "I'm a Little Teapot (Bonus)"

References

External links
+/- official discography

2014 albums
+/- (band) albums
TeenBeat Records albums